Hugo Cianci (born 9 June 1989) is a French professional football player who most recently played for Annecy.

Career 
He began his career at Grenoble Foot in 2007 and was promoted to the first team in 2009, he made his debut on 7 November 2009 against Monaco in the Ligue 1.

Having arrived at Annecy FC in July 2017, he left in early January 2019.

References

External links
 French League Stats
 
 

1989 births
Living people
French people of Italian descent
French footballers
Ligue 1 players
Ligue 2 players
Grenoble Foot 38 players
US Boulogne players
FC Annecy players
Sportspeople from Grenoble
Association football defenders
Footballers from Auvergne-Rhône-Alpes